Carmela Toso (30 September 1912 – 11 March 2002) was an Italian gymnast. She competed in the women's artistic team all-around event at the 1936 Summer Olympics.

References

External links
 

1912 births
2002 deaths
Italian female artistic gymnasts
Olympic gymnasts of Italy
Gymnasts at the 1936 Summer Olympics